My Big Fat Obnoxious Fiance is an American reality television series broadcast by the Fox Broadcasting Company (Fox). The six-episode series premiered on January 19, 2004, and concluded on February 23, 2004. Filmed in Los Angeles, California, the series followed Randi Coy, a 23-year-old teacher, in competition for a $1,000,000 reward. In order to win the reward, Coy was required to convince her family and friends that she was engaged to and planned to elope with Steven Williams, an ill-mannered 29-year-old man. If any of Coy's family members refused to attend her wedding or objected during the ceremony, Coy would lose the competition. Coy was under the impression that Williams was another contestant competing for a monetary reward, however, he was actually Steven Bailey, an actor hired to thwart her attempt to win the competition. The series was hosted by Canadian actor Claudia DiFolco.

My Big Fat Obnoxious Fiance received mixed reception from television critics; some critics found the series entertaining while others believed the premise was contrived. The series garnered high ratings and was one of the top viewed reality television programs of the 2003–04 television season. While the series did not spawn a second season, its success resulted in a 2004 spin-off titled My Big Fat Obnoxious Boss. In 2005, My Big Fat Obnoxious Fiance was one of several television programs cited in a class-action lawsuit filed by the Writers Guild of America concerning labor law violations.

Format
An elementary school teacher named Randi Coy is offered $250,000 for herself and $250,000 for the rest of her family if she takes part in a fake wedding engagement to a man named "Steve Williams," who will also win $250,000 for himself and $250,000 for his family. They have to convince their families of their engagement and get married in 12 days time with all their family members attending and without any of them objecting, in order to win the money. However, what Randi does not know is that Steve is, in reality, a professional actor, whose goal is to make things difficult for Randi.

In the first episode, things get complicated as the fake fiance is revealed to be the very annoying and unattractive man who fits the show's title. The revelation of the engagement to Randi's family intentionally causes tension. The episodes after continue to follow Randi, Steve, and the Coys as they prepare for the wedding. To make matters more crazy, the Coys meet Steve's family.

On the wedding day, Steve and Randi arrive at the altar and proceed with their vows. Randi says 'I do' and when it comes to Steve's turn, he acts emotional and eventually announces that the whole wedding was a setup. At the same time it is revealed that Steve is in fact actor Steven W. Bailey, and his "family" were also all professional actors – something that even Randi did not know. When Steve reveals that "it's fake" and that he is an actor, Randi begins crying.

Because nobody caught on to the entire scheme, and because Randi was unaware that Steve was part of the scam, she and her family were presented with double the amount of money that Randi had expected – $500,000 for herself and $500,000 for her family.

Episodes

Reception
Laura Fries of Variety claimed the show's premise was contrived.

Adaptations
The first country to adapt the format was Russia. The show Мой толстый противный жених was first aired on DTV-Viasat in October 9, 2004 and lasted for one season.

The German broadcaster Sat. 1 adopted the format and aired Mein großer, dicker, peinlicher Verlobter in late 2004.

In France Mon incroyable fiancé was aired on TF1 in summer 2005 and Mon incroyable fiancé 2 in summer 2009. In the second season, Christopher, a heterosexual, had to convince his family that he turned homosexual and wanted to marry his newly found boyfriend in Spain. As with the American version, the participant is unaware their fiance is an actor. A third season has started airing on October 17, 2014.

In the Netherlands Mijn vieze, vette, vervelende verloofde ("My dirty, fat, annoying fiancé") aired in September/October 2012.

Lawsuit
On August 23, 2005, My Big Fat Obnoxious Fiance was one of several television programs cited in a class-action lawsuit filed by the Writers Guild of America. The suit was filed in the Los Angeles County Superior Court and targeted the special's production company, Rocket Science Laboratories, and the special's network, Fox.

See also
 My Big Fat Obnoxious Boss

References

External links
  at the Wayback Machine
 

2000s American reality television series
2004 American television series debuts
2004 American television series endings
American dating and relationship reality television series
English-language television shows
Fox Broadcasting Company original programming
Reality television series parodies
Television series by Rocket Science Laboratories